General elections were held in Trinidad and Tobago on 15 December 1986. The result was a victory for the National Alliance for Reconstruction, which won 33 of the 36 seats. Voter turnout was 65.5%.

Results

Elected members

References 

Trinidad
Elections in Trinidad and Tobago
1986 in Trinidad and Tobago